Muneer Goolam Fareed (born 1956) is a Muslim scholar and the former secretary general of ISNA (Islamic Society of North America).

Biography
Muneer Fareed is a South African citizen of Indian descent.
He studied Arabic language and literature at King Abdulaziz University, Mecca and got a theological license in Islamic studies (Ijazah) from the Darul Uloom Deoband, India.
Fareed moved to the U.S. in 1989 and obtained his Ph.D. in 1994 from the University of Michigan, with his dissertation entitled, "Legal Reform in the Muslim world: The anatomy of a scholarly dispute in the 19th and the early 20th centuries on the usage of Ijtihad as a legal tool." 
He worked as an imam of the Islamic Association of Greater Detroit from 1989 to 2000 and was an associate professor of Islamic studies at Wayne State University until 2006.
He succeeded Sayyid Syeed as the new secretary general of the Islamic Society of North America in late 2006. 
Fareed is also a member of the Fiqh Council of North America.

External links 
Muneer Fareed Resume
Portrait at the American Learning Institute for Muslims
Muneer Fareed former ISNA Secretary General (2007-2008)
Interview of Diffused Congruence podcast, 7 February 2014

1956 births
University of Michigan alumni
Wayne State University faculty
Living people